Stegasta bosqueella (red-necked peanutworm moth) is a species of moth of the family Gelechiidae. It is found in North America, including Alabama, Florida, Georgia, Illinois, Iowa, North Carolina, Oklahoma, South Carolina, Texas and Virginia.

The larvae are a pest on Arachis hypogaea. They feed on the foliage of their host plant.

References

Moths described in 1875
Stegasta